The Walking Legs-forward is an ancient Egyptian language hieroglyph of the concept of action, part of "going and returning". Walking Legs-returning is the other half.

The phonetic value of the hieroglyph is iw, and means "to come". It is also used as a determinative in word formation.

Language usage of Walking Legs-forward
In passages written by the pharaoh, or in stories, coming and going is common. Examples are travels to foreign lands, or of visitors from other lands. Another example is the coming-and-goings to ceremonial religious sites, or festivals. Another example might be discussions about the need of workers traveling to the quarries or mines.

Rosetta Stone usage
Though not appearing in the Rosetta Stone, (or the lost beginning half used from the Nubayrah Stele), the twin concept with the "Walking Legs-returning" shows how either can be interchanged. And besides Ptolemy V whose name uses the returning walking feet as Ptolemy, illustrious-("pr (hieroglyph)-r-feet"=Epiphany), eucharistos, one good example is shown from line 18, (Nubayrah Stele):
He (pharaoh) took care behold to make 'to go'-(with "returning feet"), infantry, cavalry, and ships, to drive back (or, against), those who came-("returning feet"-correct usage) to fight against Egypt...

The word 'depart'

The going in-and-coming out ideas are complex and interchangeable, as can be shown by the word "depart": it uses the Walking Legs-returning hieroglyph.

See also
Gardiner's Sign List#D. Parts of the Human Body
List of Egyptian hieroglyphs

References
Budge.  The Rosetta Stone, E.A.Wallace Budge, (Dover Publications), c 1929, Dover edition(unabridged), 1989. (softcover)

Egyptian hieroglyphs: parts of the human body